Viktoras Ražaitis (9 November 1907 – 20 July 1990) was a Lithuanian athlete. He competed in the men's javelin throw at the 1928 Summer Olympics.

References

1907 births
1990 deaths
People from Marijampolė Municipality
Athletes (track and field) at the 1928 Summer Olympics
Lithuanian male javelin throwers
Olympic athletes of Lithuania